Hullickal or Pulikkal (புலிக்கல்) is a Revenue Village in Coonoor Taluk of the Nilgiris District, Tamil Nadu, India.

Villages in Nilgiris district